Dhantala is a village in the Ranaghat II CD block in the Ranaghat subdivision of  the Nadia district in the state of West Bengal, India.

Geography

Location

Area overview
Nadia district is mostly alluvial plains lying to the east of Hooghly River, locally known as Bhagirathi. The alluvial plains are cut across by such distributaries as Jalangi, Churni and Ichhamati. With these rivers getting silted up, floods are a recurring feature. The Ranaghat subdivision has the Bhagirathi on the west, with Purba Bardhaman and Hooghly districts lying across the river. Topographically, Ranaghat subdivision is spread across the Krishnanagar-Santipur Plain, which occupies the central part of the district, and the Ranaghat-Chakdaha Plain, the low-lying area found in the south-eastern part of the district. The Churni separates the two plains. A portion of the east forms the boundary with Bangladesh. The lower portion of the east is covered by a portion of the North 24 Parganas district. The subdivision has achieved reasonably high urbanisation. 41.68% of the population lives in urban areas and 58.32% lives in rural areas.

Note: The map alongside presents some of the notable locations in the subdivision. All places marked in the map are linked in the larger full screen map. All the four subdivisions are presented with maps on the same scale – the size of the maps vary as per the area of the subdivision.

Demographics
According to the 2011 Census of India, Dhantala had a total population of 9,095, of which 4,730 (52%) were males and 4,365 (48%) were females. Population in the age range 0–6 years was 887. The total number of literate persons in Dhantala was 6,332 (77.14% of the population over 6 years).

Civic administration

Police station
Dhantala and Gangnapur police stations have jurisdiction over Cooper's Camp and Ranaghat II CD block. The total area covered by the Dhantala police station is 206 km2 and the population covered is 180,725 (2001 census). 12 km of Bangladesh-India border is part of the PS area.

Transport
Dhantala is on the Ranaghat-Duttapulia road.

Dhantala connects with Krishnanagar, Bangaon and Bangladesh through this road. Ranaghat-Dhantala-Krishnanagar, Ranaghat-Dhantala-Aishmali-Bangoan, Ranaghat-Dhantala-Majhdia bus services are available. TATA Magic, electric rickshaw are available for local transport.

Nearest railway stations are Ranaghat Junction railway station and Bankimnagar railway station.

Education
Pritilata Waddedar Mahavidyalaya was established at Panikhali in 2007. It was founded as a women's college but later became co-educational. It is a government aided general degree college.
Panchberia ITI college established in 2017.

Healthcare
Aranghata Rural Hospital and Duttaphulia Rural Hospital, with 30 beds at Aranghata, is the major government medical facility in the Ranaghat II CD block.

References

Villages in Nadia district